AEGIS, or the All-Wavelength Extended Groth Strip International Survey, is a multi-wavelength astronomical survey of a patch of the sky with low extinction and zodiacal scattering. The purpose of the survey is to study the physical processes and evolution of galaxies at redshift z ~ 1.  As of February 2011 more than 80 research papers have been published based on data from the survey.

Observatories
AEGIS makes use of multiple terrestrial and space based observatories to conduct the survey.  These observatories make overlapping scans of the survey area.  The primary telescopes are:
Very Large Array
Spitzer Space Telescope
Palomar Observatory
Canada-France-Hawaii Telescope
Keck Observatory
Hubble Space Telescope
GALEX
Chandra X-ray Observatory (AEGIS-X)

See also	 
Extended Groth Strip – a visible image taken by Hubble of the region.

References

External links
Official Project Site
Hubblesite News Release

Astronomical surveys